Toyota Stadium is a stadium in Georgetown, Kentucky.  It is the home field of Georgetown College's American football, soccer, and lacrosse teams. It also hosts Lexington SC of USL League One and previously hosted the training camp for the Cincinnati Bengals. The stadium, which holds 5,000 and is expandable to 20,000, was built in 1997.

It was also used by the local Scott County High School for home high school football games from 1997 until the opening of Great Crossing High School in 2019; the two high schools now share Great Crossing's football stadium.

On February 24, 2023, Lexington SC announced they would play the 2023 USL League One season at Toyota Stadium.

See also
 List of sports venues with the name Toyota

References

External links
Toyota Stadium page at Georgetown College's Athletics's website

Georgetown Tigers football
College football venues
American football venues in Kentucky
Buildings and structures in Georgetown, Kentucky
1997 establishments in Kentucky
Sports venues completed in 1997
Cincinnati Bengals
Soccer venues in Kentucky
USL League One stadiums
College soccer venues in the United States
College lacrosse venues in the United States